PH2, also known as Kepler-86, or KIC 12735740 (2MASS 19190326+5157453), is a G-type star  distant within the constellation Cygnus. Roughly the size and temperature of the Sun, PH2 gained prominence when it was known to be the host of one of 42 planet candidates detected by the Planet Hunters citizen science project in its second data release. The candidate orbiting around PH2, known as PH2 b, had been determined to have a spurious detection probability of only 0.08%, thus effectively confirming its existence as a planet.

Located in its parent star's habitable zone, PH2 b (or Kepler-86b) is a "Jupiter-size" gas giant which may have a natural satellite suitable for hosting life. The report of the confirmed detection of PH2 b was submitted on January 3, 2013. It was discovered by amateur Pole Rafał Herszkowicz using his laptop and access to the Internet project with data from the Kepler space observatory.

History of detection
PH2 b was detected, along with 42 other planet candidates, in archival data from Kepler by the Planet Hunters project, in which human volunteers analyze the light curves of Kepler target stars, searching for planetary transit signals which may be missed by computer programs. Previous work by Planet Hunters helped to confirm the existence of PH1 b, a Neptune-mass planet within a four-star system.

All of the candidates in the second, including PH2 b, were identified by  citizen scientists Abe J. Hoekstra, Thomas Lee Jacobs, Daryll LaCourse, Hans Martin Schwengler, Rafał Herszkowicz and Mike Chopin among others, with the help of Yale University astronomers. In addition to PH2 b itself, twenty other planet candidates were found which are located in the habitable zones of their host stars; however, these have a relatively high probability of spurious detection and may well come from non-planetary sources.

Although the planet's initial detection was made using Kepler data, PH2's stellar spectra, required to rule out background stars or faint companions with planets as sources for the observed transits, were collected using the HIRES instrument at the W. M. Keck Observatory. Results of observations confirmed the existence of PH2 b with "99.9 percent confidence."

Planetary system
PH2 is host to one confirmed planet, PH2 b, orbiting with a period of about 282 days, placing it and any possible moons in the habitable zone. A moon of PH2 b would likely have "a rocky core, plus a greenhouse atmosphere of some sort that could have liquid water on its surface" in the words of the researchers, thus further improving its prospects for habitability.

See also
 Amateur exoplanet discoveries
 HIP 41378 f
 Kepler 1625 b I
 Kepler 1708 b I
 Exomoon
 Habitability of natural satellites

Notes

References

Footnotes

External links
 Kepler Mission - NASA.
 KIC-12735740 Star on Star Finder/cthreepo
 Video (00:52) - Journey To Exoplanet "PH2 b"

G-type main-sequence stars
Cygnus (constellation)
3663
J19190326+5157453
Planetary transit variables
Planetary systems with one confirmed planet